The round-eared tube-nosed fruit bat (Nyctimene cyclotis) is a species of bat in the family Pteropodidae. It is possibly conspecific with Nyctimene certans, although the taxonomy remains unresolved. The possible synonymy of the species was investigated by Randolph L. Peterson in 1991, finding the species split into two distinct groups based on morphology.  It is found in West Papua and Mansuar Island in Indonesia.

Sources

Nyctimene (genus)
Bats of Oceania
Endemic fauna of Indonesia
Mammals of Western New Guinea
Mammals described in 1910
Taxa named by Knud Andersen
Taxonomy articles created by Polbot
Bats of New Guinea